Balov or Balow is a Slavic male surname, its feminine counterpart is Balova or Balowa. It may refer to
Jillian Balow (born 1970), American politician
Larry Balow (born 1943), American politician
Rustam Balov (born 1986), Russian football player
Stoyan Balov (born 1960), Bulgarian wrestler
Uroš Balow (born 1972), Serbian publisher and diplomat